Sidney Stretton (20 November 1902 – 14 January 1984) was an English cricketer.  Stretton was a left-handed batsman who bowled left-arm fast.  He was born at Stamford, Lincolnshire.  He was registered at birth as Sydney Stretton.

Stretton made a single first-class appearance for Northamptonshire against Surrey at the County Ground, Northampton in the 1928 County Championship.  In Northamptonshire's first-innings he was dismissed for a duck by Alan Peach, while in their second-innings he was dismissed for a single run by the same bowler.  With the ball, he took the wickets of Charles Daily and Bob Gregory for the cost of 120 runs from 32 overs.

He died at Sutton-in-Ashfield, Nottinghamshire on 14 January 1984.

References

External links
Sidney Stretton at ESPNcricinfo
Sidney Stretton at CricketArchive

1902 births
1984 deaths
People from Stamford, Lincolnshire
English cricketers
Northamptonshire cricketers